Weightlifting at the 1984 Summer Paralympics consisted of fourteen events for men.

Participating nations 
There were 71 male competitors representing 20 nations.

Medal summary

Medal table 
There were 40 medal winners representing 13 nations.

Men's events 
Sources:

References 

 

1984 Summer Paralympics events
1984
Paralympics